Brendan Arthur Matthias (born 12 August 1969) is a Canadian long-distance runner. He competed in the men's 5000 metres at the 1992 Summer Olympics.

References

External links
 

1969 births
Living people
Athletes from Toronto
Athletes (track and field) at the 1992 Summer Olympics
Canadian male long-distance runners
Olympic track and field athletes of Canada
Athletes (track and field) at the 1994 Commonwealth Games
Commonwealth Games competitors for Canada